Gilani or Gillani is a toponymic surname (nisba) linked to the Gilan Province in Iran. It is also used by people indicating association with the founder of the Qadiriyya Sufi order Abdul Qadir Gilani. Notable people with the surname (or variants) include:

Sayyed Abdul-Qadir Gilani (1077–1166), 12th century Muslim Saint, Scholar and Author of books on spirituality
Sayyed Abdullah Awn ibn Yala al Hashimi al Gilani (c. 1028–1099), medieval Persian Sufi, preacher and religious scholar
 Sayyed Abd Al-Rahman Al-Gilani (1841–1927), first Prime Minister of Iraq in 1920
 Abdul Qader al-Keilani (1874–1948), early 20th century Syrian statesman and religious authority
 Ahmed Gailani (born 1932), Afghan politician
 Bahadur Khan Gilani, officer of the Gujarat Sultanate in India
 Baqa Jilani (1911–1941), early 20th century cricketer from the Punjab
 Benjamin Gilani (born 1946), Indian theatre and television actor
 Daood Gilani, pseudonym of David Headley, Pakistani−American convict for the 2008 Mumbai attacks
 Faleh Al-Kilani (born 1944), Iraqi scholar, poet, and writer
 Fatima Gailani (born 1954), Afghan political leader and women's rights activist
 Fauzia Gailani (born 1971), Afghan politician
 Haji Gilani (died 2003), participant in the 2001 Afghan war
 Hamid Raza Gilani, Pakistani politician
 Ikram Ali Shah Gelani (1947-2017) Architect, Author and Founder Director of School of Architecture & Design (UET Lahore)
 Imtiaz Gilani (born 1947), Pakistani engineer and academic
 Jamila Gilani (born 1960), Pakistani politician and leader of the Pashtun Tahafuz Movement
 Kamel al-Kilani (born 1958), minister in the Iraqi Interim Council
 Manazir Ahsan Gilani, Indian Muslim philosopher from Gilan, Bihar
 Mian Ghulam Jilani (1914–2004), critic of the Bhutto government
 Mohammad Mohammadi Gilani (born 1928), Iranian cleric and religious authority
 Mubarak Ali Gilani, Hanafi, Qadiri sheikh
 Nezam al-Din Ahmad Gilani (1585 – c. 1662), philosopher and physician during the Deccan Sultanate in India
 Rashid Ali al-Gaylani (1892–1965), Prime Minister of Iraq in 1933 and 1941
 Syeda Sarwat Gilani (born 1982), Pakistani actress and model
 Syed Ali Shah Geelani, separatist leader, important member of the All Parties Hurriyat Conference
 Sayed Ishaq Gailani (born 1954), Afghan Politician
 Syed Mumtaz Alam Gillani (born 1940), Pakistani lawyer and politician
 Syed Yousaf Raza Gillani (born 1952), Prime Minister of Pakistan from March 24, 2008, to April 26, 2012
 Zahed Gilani (1216–1301), 13th century leader of the Zahediyeh Sufi order
 Syed Iftikhar Hussain Gillani, Pakistani Former Federal Minister for Law and Justice

See also

 Gilaki (disambiguation)
 Gilak (disambiguation)
 Jilan (disambiguation)
 Gilan (disambiguation)
 List of people from Gilan

References

Persian-language surnames
Toponymic surnames
Nisbas
People from Gilan Province